Jacksonburg may refer to:

Jacksonburg, Indiana
Jacksonburg, New Jersey
Jacksonburg, New York
Jacksonburg, Ohio